Heteromyiini is a tribe of biting midges in the family Ceratopogonidae. There are about 5 genera and 16 described species in Heteromyiini.

Genera
These five genera belong to the tribe Heteromyiini:
 Clinohelea Kieffer, 1917 i c g b
 Heteromyia Say, 1825 i c g b
 Neurobezzia i c g
 Neurohelea Kieffer, 1925 i c g
 Pellucidomyia i c g
Data sources: i = ITIS, c = Catalogue of Life, g = GBIF, b = Bugguide.net

References

Further reading

External links

Ceratopogonidae
Articles created by Qbugbot
nematocera tribes